Beardstown Township is one of eleven townships in Cass County, Illinois, USA.  As of the 2020 census, its population was 6,719 and it contained 2,716 housing units.

Geography

Cities, towns, villages
 Beardstown

Unincorporated towns
 Oak Grove
(This list is based on USGS data and may include former settlements.)

Cemeteries
The township contains these three cemeteries: Beardstown City, Oak Grove and Otgen.

Major highways
  US Route 67
  Illinois Route 100
  Illinois Route 125

Airports and landing strips
 Greater Beardstown Airport

Rivers
 Illinois River

Lakes
 Lilly Lake
 Lily Lake

Demographics
As of the 2020 census there were 6,719 people, 2,532 households, and 1,610 families residing in the township. The racial makeup of the township was 54.06% White, 10.25% African American, 1.56% Native American, 1.44% Asian, 0.49% Pacific Islander, 22.00% from other races, and 10.19% from two or more races. Hispanic or Latino of any race were 37.83% of the population.

There were 2,532 households, out of which 34.20% had children under the age of 18 living with them, 44.39% were married couples living together, 13.27% had a female householder with no spouse present, and 36.41% were non-families. 32.40% of all households were made up of individuals, and 17.10% had someone living alone who was 65 years of age or older. The average household size was 2.44 and the average family size was 3.07.

The township's age distribution consisted of 24.6% under the age of 18, 9.3% from 18 to 24, 26.4% from 25 to 44, 24.7% from 45 to 64, and 15.1% who were 65 years of age or older. The median age was 36.4 years. For every 100 females, there were 94.8 males. For every 100 females age 18 and over, there were 93.7 males.

The median income for a household in the township was $45,843, and the median income for a family was $52,331. Males had a median income of $37,121 versus $25,180 for females. The per capita income for the township was $21,988. About 17.1% of families and 20.5% of the population were below the poverty line, including 24.1% of those under age 18 and 12.0% of those age 65 or over.

School districts
 Beardstown Community Unit School District 15

Political districts
 Illinois' 18th congressional district
 State House District 93
 State Senate District 47

References
 
 United States Census Bureau 2007 TIGER/Line Shapefiles
 United States National Atlas

External links
 City-Data.com
 Illinois State Archives

Townships in Cass County, Illinois
Townships in Illinois
1923 establishments in Illinois